Johannes Gräff (born in St. Gallen, Switzerland) is a Swiss neuroscientist. He currently works as an Associate Professor at the École Polytechnique Fédérale de Lausanne (EPFL). His research focuses on the neuroepigenetic bases of physiological and pathological memory formation.

Education and career 
Johannes Gräff was born and raised in St.Gallen, Switzerland, where he attended high-school at the Kantonsschule am Burggraben. He completed his undergraduate studies in biology at the University of Lausanne. During this time, he also spent one year at the University of British Columbia, where he started to become interested in neuroscience and psychology. His M.Sc. thesis, conducted with Laurent Keller in 2005, focused on the genetic causes of aging in ants. From 2005 to 2009, he completed his PhD at the Swiss Federal Institute of Technology in Zürich (ETHZ) in the lab of Isabelle Mansuy working on neuroepigenetic mechanisms that regulate learning and memory. In 2009, he moved to the Massachusetts Institute of Technology to start his postdoctoral work under the supervision of Li-Huei Tsai at the Picower Institute for Learning and Memory, focussing on a better understanding of the epigenetic processes underlying Alzheimer's disease and post-traumatic stress disorder (PTSD).

Johannes Gräff was appointed Assistant Professor on Tenure Track at the Brain Mind Institute of the School of Life Sciences at EPFL in 2013, continuing his research on the neuroepigenetic basis of learning and memory.  He was promoted to Associate professor in September 2020.

Research 
As a PhD student in Isabelle Mansuy's laboratory, Johannes Gräff identified the first protein phosphatase to regulate epigenetic mechanisms during learning and memory and demonstrated that epigenetic modifications are necessary for the spatiotemporal dynamics of memory consolidation.

As a postdoc in Li-Huei Tsai's laboratory, he showed that epigenetic mechanisms are causally involved in cognitive decline associated with neurodegeneration, as well as with the attenuation of long-term traumatic memories in a mouse model of post-traumatic stress disorder.

In his laboratory at EPFL’s Brain Mind Institute, he continues to work on deciphering the cellular and molecular mechanisms of memory formation, storage and change. To investigate these, his lab focuses on the emerging field of neuroepigenetics. Epigenetic mechanisms have not only been shown to react to fluctuating environmental contingencies, but also to encode cellular fate during development. Owing to this property of being at once dynamic and stable, Gräff's laboratory hypothesizes that epigenetic mechanisms have the potential to better understand the molecular processes that drive memory formation, storage and loss. The laboratory also explores new ways to counteract memory impairment such as in Alzheimer’s disease, and in disorders such as PTSD.

Johannes Gräff's laboratory discovered the first methylation quantitative trait locus associated with Alzheimer's disease, and identified the brain areas as well as the cellular subpopulations important for the extinction of long-lasting traumatic memories.

Awards and honours 
Johannes Gräff has received several national and international research prizes and scholarships, such as the School of Science Infinite K Award of MIT in 2013, the Young Investigator Award of the Swiss Society for Biological Psychiatry, an ERC Starting Grant in 2015, the MQ fellows award in 2016, the Vallee scholarship in 2019 and the Boehringer Ingelheim FENS Research Award by the Federation of European Neuroscience Societies in 2020.

He is a member of research societies such as the Swiss Society for Neuroscience (SSN), the Molecular and Cellular Cognition Society (MCCS), the Society for Neuroscience (SfN), a founding member of the FENS-Kavli Network of Excellence, and has been an Executive Committee member of the European Brain and Behaviour Society (EBBS) from 2015 to 2018.

He is also serving on the scientific advisory board for the Centre de Biologie Integrative in Toulouse, and from 2014 to 2017 for the International Food and Nutrition Center at EPFL.

Extracurricular activities 
Since 2007, Johannes Gräff has been a regular contributor to the science section of the Swiss newspaper Neue Zürcher Zeitung, covering neuroscientific and psychological topics.  He has been a regular speaker at the Brain Awareness Week since 2016.

References 

1978 births
Living people
Academic staff of the École Polytechnique Fédérale de Lausanne
Swiss neuroscientists
University of Lausanne alumni